At the 1924 Winter Olympics, one individual ski jumping event was contested. It was held on Monday 4 February 1924.

The event was unusual in that the bronze medalist was not determined for fifty years. Thorleif Haug of Norway was awarded third place at the event's conclusion, but a clerical error in calculating Haug's score was discovered in 1974 by Jacob Vaage, who further determined Anders Haugen of the United States, who had finished fourth, had actually scored 0.095 points more than Haug. The International Olympic Committee verified this, and in Oslo in September 1974, Haug's daughter presented the medal to the 86-year-old Haugen.

Medalists

Results

This competition took place at Le Mont with a K-point of 71 meters. The winner of the competition Jacob Tullin Thams also won a silver medal in sailing at the 1936 Summer Olympics; he is among very few athletes to win both Winter and Summer Olympic medals.

Participating nations
A total of 27 ski jumpers from nine nations competed at the Chamonix Games:

References

External links
International Olympic Committee results database
Official Official Olympic Report
 

 
1924 Winter Olympics events
1924
1924 in ski jumping
Ski jumping competitions in France